Rap Kreyòl, started in Haiti in the early ‘80s by the Late Great Master Dji, who witnessed how American Hip Hip gave birth to French Hip Hip while living in France. Hence, he moved back to Haiti and started the Hip Hop movement that took Haiti by storm. Consequently, many of those kids which Hip Hop spoke to in their special language for the first time continue to rap in Haitian Creole even after being in the United States the most part of their lives. Artists like Oz'mosis and Bennchoumy still rap in Haitian Creole still today. Often, hardcore beats are used while the artist raps in Haitian Creole. Rap kreyòl has been part of the Haitian culture since the early 1980s with groups such as Original Rap Staff, King Posee, Rap Kreyòl S.A., Masters of Haiti, Fighters, Blackdo, Fam-Squad, Supa Deno, Prince Berlin, and Muzion attaining prominence, but lately has become very popular with Haitian youth. Another notable group from the 1990s is Black Leaders. The impact of Black Leaders and its members is lasting. Though known primarily for his role in Black Leaders, Don Roy is still an active contributor to Haitian music across many genres. Since the peak of his notoriety, Don Roy has chosen to create in other genres.  While still working in a production capacity in genres such as Rap Kreyòl and Reggae, Don Roy has chosen to create and work with prominent artists of the modern roots/Rasin movement.

Many Haitian Rap Kreyòl artists have had rough childhoods and difficult living conditions producing rappers who address socio-economic topics in their lyrics. Though similar to mainstream American hip hop in that materialistic imagery is portrayed or lyricized, the negative aspects of less fortunate Haitian society, such as topics concerning slum life, gang warfare, the drug trade, and poverty, are much more.

See also
Rabòday
Rasin

References

 
Hip Hop
 Afro-Caribbean music
 Haitian music